"The Hunter" is a blues song first recorded by Albert King in 1967 for his landmark album Born Under a Bad Sign.  It was written by Stax Records' house band, Booker T. and the MGs, and Carl Wells.  Along with "Born Under a Bad Sign" and "Crosscut Saw", "The Hunter" is one of King's best-known and most-recorded songs.  In 1969, Ike & Tina Turner's version reached the singles charts in the U.S.

Composition and lyrics
"The Hunter" is a mid-tempo twenty-four bar blues in the key of A.  Although the music reflects more modern trends in blues, the lyrics contain some of the swagger of the verses Willie Dixon wrote for Muddy Waters in the 1950s:

Recording and releases
The song was recorded on June 9, 1967, at the Stax Records studio in Memphis, Tennessee.  Albert King sings and plays lead guitar.  The backing is provided by Booker T. Jones on organ, Steve Cropper on rhythm guitar, Donald "Duck" Dunn on bass, Al Jackson Jr. on drums; plus members of the Memphis Horns, Wayne Jackson on trumpet, Andrew Love on tenor saxophone and Joe Arnold on baritone saxophone.

"The Hunter" was first released on Albert King's 1967 album, Born Under a Bad Sign, which "became one of  the most popular and influential blues albums of the late '60s". Writing for AllMusic, Stephen Thomas Erlewine described "The Hunter" as one of the songs that "form the very foundation of Albert King's musical identity and legacy. In 1969, the song was released as a single, but did not reach the charts.  The song later appeared on various Albert King compilation albums, including King of the Blues Guitar (Atlantic Records, 1989) and The Ultimate Collection (Rhino Records, 1993).

Ike & Tina Turner version

Ike & Tina Turner recorded their rendition of "The Hunter", which was used as the opening track for their 1969 Blue Thumb Records album of the same name.  The album is one of their most blues-oriented and earned Tina Turner a Grammy nomination in 1969. 

A shorter single edit was also released; a review in Record World noted: "Ike and Tina really tear it up on this, originally done by Albert King; and it's funky and great." The single reached No. 37 on Billboard's Best Selling Soul Singles chart and No. 93 on its broader Hot 100. The song was later included on the compilations albums The Best of Ike & Tina Turner (Blue Thumb Records, 1973) and The Ike & Tina Turner Story: 1960–1975 (Time Life, 2007).

Other renditions
Canned Heat recorded a demo version in 1967, but re-recorded it as "Amphetamine Annie" (an early anti-drug song) using the same music (Boogie with Canned Heat 1968).  In 1968, English rock group Free recorded the song for their debut album, Tons of Sobs. An album review noted the similarity between their version and that by Led Zeppelin, which appears during the "How Many More Times" medley on their 1969 self-titled debut album. 

In his autobiography, Paul Stanley explained that the idea for the 1977 Kiss song "Love Gun" came from King's song. Danzig recorded "The Hunter" for their 1988 self-titled debut album, with the songwriter listed as Glenn Danzig. A review described it as "sadomasochistic, yet catchy [tune] which sounds like it could have been written by Spinal Tap".

Footnotes

References

1967 songs
1969 singles
Songs written by Steve Cropper
Songs written by Booker T. Jones
Songs written by Al Jackson Jr.
Albert King songs
Ike & Tina Turner songs
Pacific Gas & Electric (band) songs
Blues songs
Blue Thumb Records singles
Liberty Records singles